Adama is an album by bassist Avishai Cohen.

Background
This was Cohen's first recording as leader. He co-produced it with Chick Corea.

Music and recording
All but one of the tracks were written by Cohen; the other is "Besame Mucho".

Personnel
 Avishai Cohen – bass
 Steve Wilson – soprano sax
 Steve Davis – trombone
 Jason Lindner, Brad Mehldau - (track 10), Danilo Pérez – piano
 Chick Corea – Fender Rhodes (track 11)
 Amos Hoffman – guitar, oud
 Jeff Ballard – drums, percussion
 Jorge Rossy – drums (tracks 10, 11)
 Don Alias – congas (track 11)
 Claudia Acuña – vocals (track 12)

References

1998 albums
Avishai Cohen (bassist) albums